Golden Chicken 2 (金雞2 gam1 gai1) is a 2003 Hong Kong film directed by Samson Chiu. It is a sequel to the 2002 Golden Chicken.

Cast and roles
 Sandra Ng – Kam
 Bing – Granny B in the queue
 Cha Man-Wet – Mainland businessman A
 Chan Chi-Shuen – Teddy boy A
 Erica Chan – Mahjong player D
 Chan Lai-Fun – Mother-in-law's relative
 Chan Ming-Yam – Building watchman
 Chan Wai-Ling – Friend D at temple
 Ronald Cheng
 Dicky Cheung – Water man
 Jacky Cheung – Quincy
 Cheung Kin-Hung – CCB investigator A
 Sabrina Cheung – Northern hooker B
 Kenny Chin – Customer in appliance store
 Choi Tat-Wah – Happy Corner worker C
 Chui Hin-Fung – CCB investigator B
 Alva Chun – Northern hooker A
 Wancy Dai – 7-Eleven shopkeeper
 Fung Ka-Ying – Nightclub hostess B
 Ho Ka-Kou – Nightclub guest A
 Nichole Hor – Mahjong player B
 Ho Yat-Wa – Future cop B
 Hua Tau – Teddy boy B
 Carlos Koo – Male jogger
 Silver Kwok – Mahjong player C
 Leon Lai – Doctor Chow Man Kwong
 Lai Li-Li – Female jogger
 Rita Lai – Madam A's best maid
 Lam Lai-Kuen – 7-Eleven customer D
 Lam Si-Wing – Registrar assistant
 Andy Lau – chief executive in year 2046
 Lau Kuen – Mainland businessman B
 Lau Kwun-Hung – Temple worker B
 Lau Man-Ting – Woman D in the queue
 Lau Yo-Ha – Woman in house
 Lau Yu-Hai – Granny A in the queue
 Law Dong-Mei – Woman A in the queue
 Angelica Lee	
 Lee Ka-Sin – Nightclub hostess A
 Lee Ka-Wing – Happy Corner worker A
 Leung Ho-Ming – Pervert at temple
 Leung Wai-Ching – Woman C in the queue
 Leung Wai-Yan – Fishball girl C
 Leung Yau-Sen – Old man in the queue
 Ling Ling-Chui – Friend C at temple
 Michelle Lo – Mahjong player A
 Lui Chui-Tsang – Madam A's mother-in-law
 Fiona Lui – Frightened female customer
 Lui Ho-Kwong – Noodle Stall worker B
 Lum Chun-Ka – Massage parlour manager
 May – Filipino maid
 Ming Ng – Dog owner
 Mok King-Wah – Nightclub guest B
 Kenneth Ng – Kum's father
 Vincent Ng – Noodle stall worker A
 Ivy Pang – Friend A at temple
 Samdasani Rajesh – Indian client
 Nicky Shih – Happy Corner worker B
 Sin She-Kin – 7-Eleven Customer B
 Siu Hung – Temple worker A
 Sum Wai-Leung – Mainland China police B
 Tam Yuen-Si – Woman B in the queue
 Tang Hon-Tai – Future cop A
 Pat Tang – Woman E in the queue
 Lawrence Tan
 Kristal Tin
 Chapman To – Club owner
 Tsang Kit-Hing – Happy Corner cleaning maid
 Tsang Lap-Hung – Happy Corner worker D
 Anthony Wong Chau-sang – Chow
 Wong Chiu-Wa – Frightened male customer
 Felix Wong
 May Wong – Friend B at temple
 Wong Tsz-Kwan – Fishball girl B
 Wu Yak-Ping – 7-Eleven customer A
 Yai Tat-Sing – Little boy
 Yau Ka-Lam – Little girl
 Amy Yeung – Northern hooker C
 Devily Yeung – Fishball girl A
 Yip Ying-Wai – Marriage registrar
 Yu Cheung-Man – Mainland China police A
 Yuen Mun-Lam – 7-Eleven customer C

See also
 Prostitution in Hong Kong

References

External links
 
 HK Cinemagic entry
 lovehkfilm.com entry

Hong Kong comedy films
2003 films
2003 comedy films
2000s Cantonese-language films
Films about prostitution in Hong Kong
Films with screenplays by James Yuen
Films directed by Samson Chiu
2000s Hong Kong films